The Riverside Arena is a 2,500-seat multipurpose arena located in Austin, Minnesota.  Built in 1973, it is home to the Austin High School Packers boys' and girls' ice hockey teams as well as the Austin Bruins of the North American Hockey League.

External links
Riverside Arena - City of Austin
Riverside Arena - Austin Chamber of Commerce
Riverside Arena - StadiumJourney
Discover Riverside Arena- Discover Austin, Minnesota!

Indoor arenas in Minnesota
Sports venues in Minnesota
North American Hockey League
Tourist attractions in Mower County, Minnesota
Indoor ice hockey venues in Minnesota
Buildings and structures in Austin, Minnesota
1973 establishments in Minnesota
Sports venues completed in 1973